Ugo Amaldi may refer to:

 Ugo Amaldi (mathematician) (1875–1957), Italian mathematician
 Ugo Amaldi (physicist) (born 1934), Italian physicist, grandson of the above